Sierra de Vallejo Biosphere Reserve is a protected natural area of western Mexico. It protects the Sierra de Vallejo, a Pacific coastal mountain range in southern Nayarit state. The reserve was established in 2004, and covers an area of 549.35 km2.

References

Biosphere reserves of Mexico
Protected areas of Nayarit
Jalisco dry forests